Storå may refer to the following locations:

Storå, Norway, a small village in Tysfjord Municipality, Nordland County, Norway
Storå, Sweden, a village in Lindesberg Municipality, Örebro County, Sweden 
Storå, Denmark, a creek in Denmark's West Jutland
Storå is also the Swedish name of Isojoki in Finland